Angus Nunatak is the northern of two nunataks which lie close north of Mount Brecher in the Wisconsin Range of the Horlick Mountains in Antarctica. It was mapped by the United States Geological Survey from surveys and from U.S. Navy air photos, 1959–60, and named by the Advisory Committee on Antarctic Names for Gordon W. Angus, ionospheric physicist, Byrd Station winter party, 1961.

References
 

Nunataks of Wilkes Land